Tim Conley (born December 8, 1958) is an American professional golfer who played on the PGA Tour, Nationwide Tour and most recently the Champions Tour.

Conley joined the PGA Tour in 1993, earning his card through qualifying school. He did not perform well on Tour in his rookie year but he did win the Nike Knoxville Open on the Nationwide Tour. In 1994 he played on the Nationwide Tour full-time and recorded a runner up finish but only made 7 of 21 cuts. He continued to play on the Nationwide Tour and won the Nike Gateway Classic in 1996 in a playoff. He returned to the PGA Tour in 1998, earning his card through qualifying school. He had another poor year on Tour but did finish 5th at the FedEx St. Jude Classic, his best finish on the PGA Tour of his career. He returned to the Nationwide Tour in 1999 where he would play until 2000. He played in a limited number of events until 2007 when he joined the Champions Tour. He finished 83rd on the money list in his rookie year on Tour, missing only one cut in 13 events. He played in fewer events in 2008 and 2009 and has not played on the Tour since.

Professional wins (9)

Nike Tour wins (2)

Nike Tour playoff record (1–0)

Other wins (7)
this list may be incomplete
1989 Bermuda Open
1992 Kansas Open
2004 Caribbean Open
2005 Georgia Open
2006 Bermuda Open
2007 Bermuda Open
1 win on the NGA Hooters Tour

Results in major championships

CUT = missed the halfway cut
Note: Conley only played in the U.S. Open.

See also
1992 PGA Tour Qualifying School graduates
1997 PGA Tour Qualifying School graduates

References

External links

American male golfers
PGA Tour golfers
PGA Tour Champions golfers
Akron Zips men's golfers
Golfers from Cleveland
1958 births
Living people